The 2009 Pro Bowl was the National Football League's all-star game for the 2008 season. It was played at Aloha Stadium in Honolulu, Hawaii on February 8, 2009. This was the most recent year that the game was held after the Super Bowl. The NFC defeated the AFC, 30–21.

The AFC was coached by Baltimore's John Harbaugh, while the NFC's coach was Philadelphia's Andy Reid.

This is the last game to be held one week after the Super Bowl, the last game where the coaching staffs were from the teams who lost their conference title games, and the last game where players of the two teams competing in the Super Bowl play in the Pro Bowl.

AFC roster

Offense

Defense

Special teams

NFC roster

Offense

Defense

Special teams

Notes:
Replacement selection due to injury or vacancy
Injured player; selected but did not play
Replacement starter; selected as reserve
"Need player"; named by coach
Philip Rivers was the first alternate, but declined due to injury
 Hope was selected as strong safety

Number of selections per team

References

External links

NFL.com – 2009 Pro Bowl Gamebook
Official Pro Bowl website at NFL.com

Pro Bowl
Pro Bowl
Pro Bowl
Pro Bowl
Pro Bowl
American football competitions in Honolulu
Pro Bowl